Otokomi Mountain is located in the Lewis Range, Glacier National Park in the U.S. state of Montana. Named for George Bird Grinnell's part-Blackfoot hunting partner named Otokomi which means "yellowfish'. Otokomi Mountain is north of the Rising Sun Auto Camp and Saint Mary Lake.

See also
 Mountains and mountain ranges of Glacier National Park (U.S.)

References

Mountains of Glacier County, Montana
Mountains of Glacier National Park (U.S.)
Lewis Range